The men's long jump event at the 2003 Summer Universiade was held on 27–28 August in Daegu, South Korea.

Medalists

Results

Qualification

Final

References
Results

Athletics at the 2003 Summer Universiade
2003